The 2018 WNBA season was the 19th season for the Indiana Fever of the Women's National Basketball Association. The Fever began play on May 19, 2018. 

The Fever started the season poorly by going 0–5 in May. Fortunes did not improve in June and the team was 1–10. The only win was 96–64 against the Atlanta Dream. However, June did include some close losses. The Fever lost to the New York Liberty 78–75 after the Liberty made a 3-pointer with 16.1 seconds left. On the 12th, the Fever lost in overtime against the Las Vegas Aces. In July, the Fever were 2–8, with the two wins coming against the perennial play-off contenders Minnesota Lynx and Los Angeles Sparks. Both wins were away from home, which meant the Fever were 0–4 at home. In the final month of the season, the Fever were 3–5.  They finished with a WNBA worst 6–28 final record, which was also their worst record in franchise history. Their misfortunes continued in the offseason as they lost in the draft lottery in spite of having the best odds, ending with the third selection for the 2019 WNBA draft.

Transactions

WNBA draft

The Fever made three selections in the 2018 WNBA entry draft, held on April 12:

Trades

Personnel changes

Additions

Subtractions

Roster

Schedule

Preseason

|- style="background:#bbffbb"
| 1
| May 7
| Chicago
| W 79–65
| Mavunga (18)
| Tied (8)
| Peterson (4)
| Bankers Life Fieldhouse4,377 
| 1–0
|- style="background:#fcc;"
| 2
| May 12
| Washington
| L 56–91
| K. Mitchell (9)
| Mavunga (4)
| K. Mitchell (3)
| Acierno Arena (University of Delaware)3,323 
| 1–1

Regular season

|- style="background:#fcc;"
| 1
| May 19
| Chicago
| L 64–82
| Dupree (14)
| Dupree (8)
| Wheeler (4)
| Bankers Life Fieldhouse6,565
| 0–1
|- style="background:#fcc;"
| 2
| May 20
| @ Washington
| L 75–82
| Achonwa (21)
| Achonwa (12)
| Wheeler (5)
| Capital One Arena7,400
| 0–2
|- style="background:#fcc;"
| 3
| May 22
| Los Angeles
| L 70–87
| K. Mitchell (20)
| Achonwa (8)
| K. Mitchell (4)
| Bankers Life Fieldhouse4,742
| 0–3
|- style="background:#fcc;"
| 4
| May 24
| Washington
| L 84–93
| K. Mitchell (25)
| Dupree (7)
| T. Mitchell (3)
| Bankers Life Fieldhouse4,415
| 0–4
|- style="background:#fcc;"
| 5
| May 26
| @ Connecticut
| L 77–86
| K. Mitchell (18)
| McCall (9)
| Wheeler (9)
| Mohegan Sun Arena5,843
| 0–5

|- style="background:#fcc;"
| 6
| June 2
| New York
| L 81–87
| K. Mitchell (26)
| Dupree (8)
| Wheeler (7)
| Bankers Life Fieldhouse5,575
| 0–6
|- style="background:#fcc;"
| 7
| June 8
| Dallas
| L 83–89
| K. Mitchell (26)
| McCall (11)
| Tied (4)
| Bankers Life Fieldhouse5,675
| 0–7
|- style="background:#fcc;"
| 8
| June 10
| @ New York
| L 75–78
| K. Mitchell (19)
| Achonwa (10)
| T. Mitchell (7)
| Westchester County Center1,537
| 0–8
|- style="background:#fcc;"
| 9
| June 12
| Las Vegas
| L 92–101 (OT)
| Achonwa (26)
| Achonwa (15)
| Wheeler (8)
| Bankers Life Fieldhouse5,437
| 0–9
|- style="background:#fcc;"
| 10
| June 14
| @ Atlanta
| L 67–72
| Dupree (17)
| Tied (7)
| Wheeler (10)
| McCamish Pavilion 6,561
| 0–10
|- style="background:#bbffbb"
| 11
| June 16
| Atlanta
| W 96–64
| Vivians (21)
| Tied (6)
| K. Mitchell (5)
| Bankers Life Fieldhouse6,234
| 1–10
|- style="background:#fcc;"
| 12
| June 19
| @ Los Angeles
| L 55–74
| Achonwa (13)
| Achonwa (14)
| K. Mitchell (3)
| Staples Center8,857
| 1–11
|- style="background:#fcc;"
| 13
| June 22
| @ Seattle
| L 63–72
| Dupree (15)
| Tied (7)
| Wheeler (4)
| KeyArena8,142
| 1–12
|- style="background:#fcc;"
| 14
| June 24
| Connecticut
| L 78–87
| Achonwa (16)
| Dupree (8)
| K. Mitchell (4)
| Bankers Life Fieldhouse5,458
| 1–13
|- style="background:#fcc;"
| 15
| June 27
| @ Connecticut
| L 89–101
| Vivians (25)
| Achonwa (6)
| 3 Tied (3)
| Mohegan Sun Arena5,112
| 1–14
|- style="background:#fcc;"
| 16
| June 29
| Phoenix
| L 77–95
| K. Mitchell (19)
| Dupree (6)
| Vivians (4)
| Bankers Life Fieldhouse7,241
| 1–15

|- style="background:#fcc;"
| 17
| July 1
| Atlanta
| L 83–87
| Vivians (27)
| Tied (7)
| K. Mitchell (4)
| Bankers Life Fieldhouse5,277
| 1–16
|- style="background:#bbffbb"
| 18
| July 3
| @ Minnesota
| W 71–59
| Achonwa (17)
| Tied (9)
| K. Mitchell (5)
| Target Center8,632
| 2–16
|- style="background:#fcc;"
| 19
| July 5
| @ Dallas
| L 63–90
| Dupree (21)
| Tied (5)
| Wheeler (3)
| College Park Center4,043
| 2–17
|- style="background:#fcc;"
| 20
| July 11
| Minnesota
| L 65–87
| Wheeler (12)
| Tied (6)
| Wheeler (5)
| Bankers Life Fieldhouse10,006
| 2–18
|- style="background:#fcc;"
| 21
| July 13
| @ Atlanta
| L 74–98
| T. Mitchell (17)
| T. Mitchell (6)
| Wheeler (4)
| McCamish Pavilion3,807
| 2–19
|- style="background:#fcc;"
| 22
| July 15
| Phoenix
| L 82–101
| Dupree (23)
| Dupree (9)
| Tied (4)
| Bankers Life Fieldhouse6,302
| 2–20
|- style="background:#fcc;"
| 23
| July 18
| @ Minnesota
| L 65–89
| Dupree (20)
| Tied (4)
| Tied (4)
| Target Center17,933
| 2–21
|- style="background:#bbffbb"
| 24
| July 20
| @ Los Angeles
| W 78–76
| Tied (16)
| Achonwa (9)
| Tied (5)
| Staples Center10,532
| 3–21
|- style="background:#fcc;"
| 25
| July 22
| @ Las Vegas
| L 74–88
| Achonwa (21)
| Tied (7)
| Pondexter (7)
| Mandalay Bay Events Center5,368
| 3–22
|- style="background:#fcc;"
| 26
| July 24
| Seattle
| L 72–92
| K. Mitchell (26)
| Dupree (12)
| Tied (4)
| Bankers Life Fieldhouse5,908
| 3–23

|- style="background:#bbffbb"
| 27
| August 2
| Dallas
| W 84–78
| Pondexter (18)
| Achonwa (5)
| Wheeler (5)
| Bankers Life Fieldhouse5,981
| 4–23
|- style="background:#bbffbb"
| 28
| August 4
| @ New York
| W 68–55
| Dupree (25)
| Achonwa (13)
| Wheeler (7)
| Westchester County Center2,225
| 5–23
|- style="background:#fcc;"
| 29
| August 7
| Seattle
| L 79–94
| Dupree (22)
| Dupree (8)
| Pondexter (5)
| Bankers Life Fieldhouse6,401
| 5–24
|- style="background:#fcc;"
| 30
| August 10
| @ Phoenix
| L 74–97
| K. Mitchell (20)
| T. Mitchell (9)
| K. Mitchell (4)
| Talking Stick Resort Arena8,860
| 5–25
|- style="background:#fcc;"
| 31
| August 11
| @ Las Vegas
| L 74–92
| Wheeler (13)
| T. Mitchell (8)
| Tied (5)
| Mandalay Bay Events Center5,213
| 5–26
|- style="background:#fcc;"
| 32
| August 15
| Washington
| L 62–76
| Achonwa (15)
| Vivians (9)
| Wheeler (5)
| Bankers Life Fieldhouse7,636
| 5–27
|- style="background:#fcc;"
| 33
| August 18
| Chicago
| L 106–115
| Dupree (30)
| Achonwa (11)
| Tied (7)
| Bankers Life Fieldhouse8,442
| 5–28
|- style="background:#bbffbb"
| 34
| August 19
| @ Chicago
| W 97–92
| Tied (22)
| Achonwa (9)
| Tied (6)
| Wintrust Arena7,118
| 6–28

Standings

Awards and honors

Statistics

Regular season

References

External links

2018
2018 WNBA season
2018 in sports in Indiana